Taniva is a monotypic moth genus belonging to the family Tortricidae erected by Carl Heinrich in 1926. Its only species, Taniva albolineana, the spruce needleminer moth, was first described by William D. Kearfott in 1907.

Distribution
It is found in the northern United States and Canada.

Description
The wingspan is about 12 mm.

Biology
The larvae feed on various spruce tree species. They only feed on dead needles. They are green with a dark brown head. The species overwinters in the larval stage in constructed nests made up of live and dead spruce needles. Pupation occurs from late May to early June in a green pupa in a grey cocoon.

Adults are on wing from mid-June to early July in one generation per year.

Gallery

See also
List of Tortricidae genera

References

External links
Tortricid.net

Endotheniini
Moths of North America
Monotypic moth genera
Tortricidae genera